Afoxolaner (INN) is an insecticide and acaricide that belongs to the isoxazoline chemical compound group.

It acts as an antagonist at ligand-gated chloride channels, in particular those gated by the neurotransmitter gamma-aminobutyric acid (GABA-receptors). Isoxazolines, among the chloride channel modulators, bind to a distinct and unique target site within the insect GABA-gated chloride channels, thereby blocking pre-and post-synaptic transfer of chloride ions across cell membranes. Prolonged afoxolaner-induced hyperexcitation results in uncontrolled activity of the central nervous system and death of insects and acarines.

Marketing 
Afoxolaner is the active principle of the veterinary medicinal products NexGard (alone), Frontpro (alone)  and Nexgard Spectra (in combination with milbemycin oxime). They are indicated for the treatment and prevention of flea infestations, and the treatment and control of tick infestations in dogs and puppies (8 weeks of age and older, weighing 4 pounds (~1.8 kilograms) of body weight or greater) for one month. These products are administered orally and poisons fleas once they start feeding.

The marketing authorization was granted by the European Medicines Agency in February 2014, for NexGard and January 2015, for Nexgard Spectra, after only 14 and 12 months of quality, safety and efficacy assessment performed by the Committee for Medicinal Products for Veterinary Use (CVMP). Therefore, long-term effects are not known.

List of excipients
In NexGard and NexGard Spectra:

 Maize starch
 Soy protein fines
 Beef flavoring
 Povidone (E1201) 
 Macrogol 400 (reputed laxatives)
 Macrogol 4000 (reputed laxatives)
 Macrogol 15 hydroxystearate (reputed laxatives)
 Glycerol (E422)
 Triglycerides, medium-chain

Additionally in NexGard Spectra:

 Citric acid monohydrate (E330) 
 Butylated hydroxytoluene (E321)

Safety

Dosage 
Afoxolaner is recommended to be administered at a dose of 2.7–7 mg/kg dog's body weight.

Toxicity for mammals 
According to clinical studies performed prior marketing:

 The oral toxicity profile of afoxolaner consists of a diuretic effect (rats only), effects secondary to a reduction in food consumption (rats and rabbits only) and occasional vomiting and/or diarrhoea (dogs, 120 and 200 mg/kg bodyweight (bw)) following high oral doses. No treatment-related effects on vomiting or diarrhoea were noted following oral doses of up to 31.5 mg/kg bw in the pivotal target animal safety study, nor in the EU field trial.
 mild gastrointestinal effects (vomiting, diarrhoea), pruritus, lethargy, anorexia, and neurological signs (convulsions, ataxia and muscle tremors) have been reported in less than 0.1% of 10,000 animals treated, including isolated reports, most reported adverse reactions being self-limiting and of short duration,
 (in combination with milbemycin oxime): vomiting, diarrhoea, lethargy, anorexia, and pruritus were observed in 0.2 to 1% of 10,000 animals treated and were generally self-limiting and of short duration,
 In vitro studies reported that afoxolaner can bind to dopamine and norepinephrine cellular transport receptor systems and the CB1 receptor; inhibition of these catecholaminergic systems and certain types of competitive binding at CB1 receptors may mediate pharmacodynamic effects of diuresis, decreased food consumption, and decreased body weight in animals.

According to post-marketing safety experience:

 (in combination with milbemycin oxime): erythema and neurological signs (convulsions, ataxia and muscle tremors) have been reported in less than 0.1% of 10,000 animals treated, including isolated reports,
 The US FDA reports that some drugs in this class (isoxazolines), including afoxolaner, can have adverse neurologic effects on some dogs, such as muscle tremors, ataxia, and seizures.
Extralabel use of afoxolaner in a pet pig has been described without any adverse effects. Experimental use in commercial pigs also did not result in any adverse effects.

Selectivity in insects over mammalians 
In vivo studies (repeat-dose toxicology in laboratory animals, target animal safety, field studies) provided by MERIAL, the company that produces afoxolaner-derivative medicines, did not show evidence of neurological or behavioural effects suggestive of GABA-mediated perturbations in mammals. The Committee for Medicinal Products for Veterinary Use (CVMP) therefore concluded that binding to dog, rat or human GABA receptors is expected to be low for afoxolaner.

Selectivity for insect over mammalian GABA-receptors has been demonstrated for other isoxazolines. The selectivity might be explained by the number of pharmacological differences that exist between GABA-gated chloride channels of insects and vertebrates.

See also 
 Fluralaner

References 

Acaricides
Chloroarenes
Insecticides
Isoxazolines
Naphthalenes
Trifluoromethyl compounds
Carboxamides